Byron Island is located in the Buccaneer Archipelago, off the Kimberley coast of Western Australia.

References

Buccaneer Archipelago